R501 road may refer to:
 R501 road (Ireland)
 R501 road (South Africa)